Begging is the practice of imploring others to grant a favor, often a gift of money, with little or no expectation of reciprocation.

Begging may also refer to:

Common uses
 Begging in animals, when an animal solicits being given resources by another animal
 Begging the question, a logical fallacy
 Mendicant religious orders which specifically require public solicitation of support

Arts, entertainment, and media
 "Begging" (song), a 2013 song by Swedish singer Anton Ewald
 "Begging", a song by Dua Lipa from Dua Lipa
 "Beggin'", a 1967 song by The Four Seasons, covered by Madcon in 2007
Begging for Billionaires, 2009 American documentary film directed by Philip Klein exposing abuses of eminent domain 
"Begging You", a 1995 song by The Stone Roses, released from the album Second Coming

See also
 Aggressive panhandling, legal term designating those forms of public solicitation which have been designated as unlawful 
BEG (disambiguation)